Karatay Madrasa is a madrasa (a school with a frequently but not absolutely religious focus) built in Konya, Turkey, in 1251 by the Emir of the city Celaleddin Karatay, serving the Seljuk sultan.

History
Since 1955, the place serves as a museum where Seljuk tiles are united, while artifacts in stone or in wood are on display in Ince Minaret Madrasa, also in Konya. The collection of Karatay Museum was particularly enriched by the finds collected as of the 1970s in Kubadabad Palace royal summer residence on Lake Beyşehir shore, at eighty miles from Konya to the west.

A caravanserai, also built by Celaleddin Karatay in the outskirts of Konya, carries his name too.

Gallery

External links

 Pictures of most of the collection and some of the building

Religious buildings and structures completed in 1251
Buildings and structures in Konya
Buildings and structures of the Sultanate of Rum
Archaeological museums in Turkey
Museums established in 1955
Madrasas in Turkey
Tourist attractions in Konya
1955 establishments in Turkey
World Heritage Tentative List for Turkey
13th-century madrasas